Deborah Mesa-Pelly (born 1968) is a Cuban-born American artist. Her work is included in the collections of the Whitney Museum of American Art, the Seattle Art Museum and the International Center of Photography.

References

1968 births
Living people
20th-century American artists
20th-century American women artists
21st-century American women artists